The Randolph Street Church of Christ is a historic church in Huntsville, Alabama.  It was built in 1887 in a Gothic Revival style similar to rural churches, but built of brick.  Rather than a central entrance, the tower contains doors under pointed toplights on the sides, and a double lancet window joined under a pointed arch.  Another set of lancets flanks the tower.  On the corners of the façade and along the side walls are pilasters, dividing the sides into bays with one set of lancets each.  The eaves of the gable are corbelled.  Above the eaves, the tower is faced with tin, and each side has a pair of arched vents below a small gable.  A modern spire and weather vane top the tower.  The church sits half a block from Courthouse Square, adjacent to the rear of the Milligan Block.  The church was listed on the National Register of Historic Places in 1980.

References

National Register of Historic Places in Huntsville, Alabama
Churches on the National Register of Historic Places in Alabama
Gothic Revival church buildings in Alabama
Churches completed in 1887
Churches in Huntsville, Alabama